Podmielowiec  is a village in the administrative district of Gmina Bodzentyn, within Kielce County, Świętokrzyskie Voivodeship, in south-central Poland.

The village has a population of 280.

References

Podmielowiec